Alangudi taluk is a taluk of Pudukkottai district of the Indian state of Tamil Nadu. The headquarters of the taluk is the town of Alangudi. Kothamanagalam is also in the area. Senthangudi is also one of the villages under Alangudi. Pudukottai District Alangudi thaluk the biggest village is Kothamanagalam. Renowned Athlete Santhi Soundarajan was born in this taluk.

Demographics
According to the 2011 census, the taluk of Alangudi had a population of 170361 with 83969  males and 86392 females. There were 1029 women for every 1000 men. The taluk had a literacy rate of 72.07. Child population in the age group below 6 was 8974 Males and 8642 Females.

References 
 

Taluks of Pudukkottai district